These lists of English words of Celtic origin include English words derived from Celtic origins. These are, for example, Common Brittonic, Gaulish, Irish, Scottish Gaelic, Welsh, or other languages.

Lists of English words derived from Celtic language
List of English words of Brittonic origin
List of English words of Gaulish origin
List of English words of Irish origin
List of English words of Scottish Gaelic origin
List of English words of Welsh origin

See also 
 Irish words used in the English language

References

 Davies, John. On Keltic Words used by Early English Writers.

Tristram, Hildegaard 2007: "Why Don't the English Speak Welsh", retrieved Jan.24,2014.
Douglas Harper,"Online Etymology Dictionary", retrieved Jan.24,2014.
Hoad, TF (ed) The Concise Oxford Dictionary of English Etymology (1993) Oxford University Press 
Hoad, T.F. (ed) (1986) Oxford Concise Dictionary of English Etymology Oxford 
MacBain, A. (1911) An Etymological Dictionary of the Gaelic Language
Weekley, Ernest (1921), An Etymological Dictionary of Modern English .
Skeat, Walter W (1888), An Etymological Dictionary the English Language .

External links
Celts and Celtic Languages

 
Celtic